Patience (or forbearance) is the ability to endure difficult circumstances. Patience may involve perseverance in the face of delay; tolerance of provocation without responding in disrespect/anger; or forbearance when under strain, especially when faced with longer-term difficulties, or being able to wait for a long amount of time without getting irritated or bored. Patience is the level of endurance one can have before disrespect. It is also used to refer to the character trait of being steadfast. Antonyms include hastiness and impetuousness.

Scientific perspectives 

In psychology and in cognitive neuroscience, patience is studied as a decision-making problem, involving the choice of either a small reward in the short-term, versus a more valuable reward in the long-term.

In 2005 a study involving common marmosets and cottontop tamarins, animals of both species faced a self-control paradigm in which individuals chose between taking an immediate small reward and waiting a variable amount of time for a large reward. Under these conditions, marmosets waited significantly longer for food than tamarins. This difference cannot be explained by life history, social behaviour or brain size. It can, however, be explained by feeding ecology: marmosets rely on gum, a food product acquired by waiting for exudate to flow from trees, whereas tamarins feed on insects, a food product requiring impulsive action. Foraging ecology, therefore, may provide a selective pressure for the evolution of self-control.

Patience of human users in the online world has been the subject of much recent scientific research. In a 2012 study involving tens of millions of users who watched videos on the Internet, Krishnan and Sitaraman  show that online users lose patience in as little as two seconds while waiting for their chosen video to start playing. The study also shows that users who are connected to the Internet at faster speeds are less patient than their counterparts connected at slower speeds, demonstrating a link between the human expectation of speed and human patience. These and other scientific studies of patience have led many social commentators to conclude that the rapid pace of technology is rewiring humans to be less and less patient.

Religious perspectives

Judaism 
Patience and fortitude are prominent themes in Judaism. The Talmud extols patience as an important personal trait. The story of Micah, for example, is that he suffers many challenging conditions and yet endures, saying "I will wait for the God who saves me." Patience in God, it is said, will aid believers in finding the strength to be delivered from the evils that are inherent in the physical life.

In the Hebrew Torah, patience is referred to in several proverbs, such as "The patient man shows much good sense, but the quick-tempered man displays folly at its height" (Proverbs 14:29, NAB); "An ill-tempered man stirs up strife, but a patient man allays discord." (Proverbs 15:18, NAB); and "A patient man is better than a warrior, and he who rules his temper, than he who takes a city." (Proverbs 16:32). The emotion is also discussed in other sections, such as Ecclesiastes: "Better is the patient spirit than the lofty spirit. Do not in spirit become quickly discontented, for discontent lodges in the bosom of a fool." (Ecclesiastes 7:8-9, NAB).

Christianity 
In the Christian religion, patience is one of the most valuable virtues of life. Increasing patience is viewed as the work of the Holy Ghost in the Christian who has accepted the gift of salvation. While patience is not one of the traditional biblical three theological virtues nor one of the traditional cardinal virtues, it is part of the fruit of the Holy Spirit, according to the Apostle Paul in his Epistle to the Galatians.  Patience was included in later formulations of the seven virtues.

In the Christian Bible, patience is referred to in several sections. The Book of Proverbs notes that "through patience a ruler can be persuaded, and a gentle tongue can break a bone" (NIV); Ecclesiastes points out that the "end of a matter is better than its beginning, and patience is better than pride" (NIV); and 1 Thessalonians states that we should "be patient with all. See that no one returns evil for evil; rather, always seek what is good for each other and for all" (NAB). In the Epistle of James, the Bible urges Christians to be patient, and " see how the farmer waits for the precious fruit of the earth,...until it receives the early and the late rains." (NAB). In Galatians, patience is listed as part of the "fruit of the Spirit": "love, joy, peace, patience, kindness, goodness, faithfulness, gentleness and self-control. Against such things there is no law". (NIV). In Timothy, the Bible states that "Jesus might display his unlimited patience as an example for those who would believe on him and receive eternal life".( NIV).

Islam 

Patience with steadfast belief in Allah is called sabr, one of the best virtues of life in Islam. Through sabr, a Muslim believes that an individual can grow closer to God and thus attain true peace. It is also stressed in Islam, that Allah is with those who are patient, more specifically during calamity and suffering. Several verses in Quran urge Muslims to seek Allah's help when faced with fear and loss, with patient prayers and perseverance for Allah. For example:

Similarly, patience is mentioned in hadith Sahih Bukhari:

In Islamic tradition, Job (Arabic: أيوب, romanized: Ayyūb) illustrates a story where he demonstrated patience and steadfast belief in Allah. Ibn Kathir narrates the story in the following manner: Job was a very rich person with much land, and many animals and children — all of which were lost and soon he was struck with disease as a test from Allah. He remained steadfast and patient in his prayers to Allah, so Allah eventually relieved him of the disease, gave him double the money he lost, and raised to life twice the number of children who had died before him.

Buddhism 

In Buddhism, patience (Skt.: kshanti; Pali: khanti) is one of the "perfections" (paramitas) that a bodhisattva trains in and practices to realize perfect enlightenment (bodhi). The Buddhist concept of patience is distinct from the English definition of the word. In Buddhism, patience refers to not returning harm, rather than merely enduring a difficult situation. It is the ability to control one's emotions even when being criticized or attacked. In verse 184 of the Dhammapada it is said that 'enduring patience is the highest austerity'.

Hinduism 
Patience and forbearance is considered an essential virtue in Hinduism. In ancient literature of Hinduism, the concept of patience is referred to with the word pariksaha (patience and forbearance, Sanskrit: परिषहा), and several other words such as sahiṣṇutā (patient toleration, Sanskrit: सहिष्णुता), titiksha (forbearance, Sanskrit: तितिक्षा), sah or sahanshilata (suffer with patience, Sanskrit: सह, सहनशीलता) and several others.

Patience, in Hindu philosophy, is the cheerful endurance of trying conditions and the consequence of one's action and deeds (karma). It is also the capacity to wait, endure opposites - such as pain and pleasure, cold and heat, sorrows and joys - calmly, without anxiety, and without a desire to seek revenge. In interpersonal relationships, virtuous titiksha means that if someone attacks or insults without cause, one must endure it without feeling enmity, anger, resentment or anxiety. The concept of patience is explained as being more than trust, and as a value that reflects the state of one's body and mind. The term pariksaha is sometimes also translated as test or exam, in other contexts. Some of these concepts have been carried into the spiritual understanding of yoga. Sandilya Upanishad of Hinduism identifies ten sources of patience and forbearances: Ahimsa, Satya, Asteya, Brahmacharya, Daya, Arjava, Kshama, Dhriti, Mitahara and Saucha. In each of these ten forbearances, the virtuous implicit belief is that our current spirit and the future for everyone, including oneself, will be stronger if these forbearances are one's guide. Each source of those ten pariksaha (patience and forbearances) are:

 Ahimsa (non-violence) is not being violent to any human being and any living being at any time through one's action, with words one speaks or writes, or in one's thoughts.
 Satya is expressing and acting with truth.
 Asteya is not coveting of another’s property through any act of one’s mind, speech, or body.
 Brahmacharya is willingness to remain a bachelor by one's actions of mind, speech or body.
 Daya is unconditional kindness to everyone and all creatures.
 Arjava is the refusal to deceive or wrong others either by the performance or by non-performance of actions of one's mind, speech or body.
 Kshama is acceptance of suffering while forgiving all pleasant or unpleasant things, such as praise or blow by others.
 Dhriti is the will to remain of calm mind and spirit during periods of gain or loss of wealth or relatives.
 Mitahara is moderation and restraint in consumption of food, drinks and wealth.
 Saucha is the cleansing of the body by earth and water; and of the mind by the pursuit of understanding oneself.

The classical literature of Hinduism exists in many Indian languages. For example, Tirukkuṛaḷ written between 200 BC and 400 AD, and sometimes called the Tamil Veda, is one of the most cherished classics on Hinduism written in a South Indian language. It too discusses patience and forbearance, dedicating Chapter 16 of Book 1 to it. Tirukkuṛaḷ suggests patience is necessary for an ethical life and one's long term happiness, even if patience is sometimes difficult in the short term. Some of the verse excerpts from this book are: "our conduct must always foster forbearance"; "one must patiently endure rude remarks, because it delivers us to purity"; "if we are unjustly wronged by others, it is best to conquer our hurt with patience, accept suffering, and refrain from unrighteous retaliation"; "it is good to patiently endure injuries done to you, but to forget them is even better"; "just as the Earth bears those who dig into her, one must with patience bear with those who despise us", and so on.

Meher Baba 
The spiritual teacher Meher Baba stated that "[O]ne of the first requirements of the [spiritual] aspirant is that he should combine unfailing enthusiasm with unyielding patience....Spiritual effort demands not only physical endurance and courage, but also unshrinking forbearance and unassailable moral courage."

Philosophical perspectives 
In Human, All Too Human, philosopher Friedrich Nietzsche argued that "being able to wait is so hard that the greatest poets did not disdain to make the inability to wait the theme of their poetry." He notes that "Passion will not wait", and gives the example of cases of duels, in which the "advising friends have to determine whether the parties involved might be able to wait a while longer. If they cannot, then a duel is reasonable [because]...to wait would be to continue suffering the horrible torture of offended honor...".

See also 
 Moral character
 
 
 Slow movement (culture)
 Time
 Toleration
 Waiting (disambiguation)

References

Spirituality
Emotions
Time management
Virtue
Seven virtues
Fruit of the Holy Spirit